Trotter Creek is a rural locality in the Rockhampton Region, Queensland, Australia.

Geography
The Dee River forms the south-western to north-western boundaries.

The Burnett Highway runs along parts of the eastern and southern boundaries.

Education 
There are no schools in Trotter Creek. The nearest government primary and secondary schools are Mount Morgan State School and Mount Morgan State High School, both in Mount Morgan to the north.

References 

Suburbs of Rockhampton Region
Localities in Queensland